Barchkhoyotar (Barçxoy) is a rural locality (a selo) in Barchkhoyotarsky Selsoviet, Novolaksky District, Republic of Dagestan, Russia. The population was 451 as of 2010. There are 4 streets.

Geography 
Barchkhoyotar is located 8 km north of Novolakskoye (the district's administrative centre) by road, on the bank of the Yamansu River. Zoriotar and Charavali are the nearest rural localities.

Nationalities 
Chechens live there.

References 

Rural localities in Novolaksky District